Raiders of the Lost Art may refer to:

 "Raiders of the Lost Art" (Gossip Girl), episode 109 of Gossip Girl
 "Raiders of the Lost Art" (Legends of Tomorrow), episode 25 of Legends of Tomorrow

See also
 Raiders of the Lost Ark